Der Freitag (English: The Friday, stylized in its logo as der Freitag) is a German weekly newspaper established in 1990. It is published in Rhenish format. The place of publication is Berlin. Its publisher and editor-in-chief is Jakob Augstein.

History
The newspaper was founded on 9 November 1990 with the name Freitag. It had some predecessors, one with the name of Sonntag, which was established in 1946. The paper originally described itself as "the East West Weekly", being established in the year of German reunification, but underwent a substantial rebranding in 2009, including the addition of the definite article (it was previously just Freitag) as well as the new claim "das Meinungsmedium". This followed the 2008 acquisition of the paper by Jakob Augstein. The rebranding was judged a success by the Society for News Design, judging it one of the three "World's Best Designed Newspapers" in 2010. Starting with edition 36 on September 5, 2019 der Freitag was published with the new subheadline „Die Wochenzeitung" („the Weekly Newspaper") and a redesigned front page. The paper's logo was placed higher up and the front-page picture enlarged. According to the publishing house the new subline is supposed to emphasise der Freitag's „strength as Weekly Paper and thus as medium for background reporting and analysis".

Profile
Since its relaunch in 2009 the newspaper consists of three sections – Politics, Culture and Everyday Life, plus an additional economics section each month. Also monthly is its arts supplement called "Kultur+," which features current stage productions, exhibitions and cultural events. Several times a year, special literature supplements on new publications that encompass fiction and non-fiction are featured.
A "Guardian-Reportage" is included six times a year. This is a Long Read extracted from the British Newspaper The Guardian and translated into German. Der Freitag has a syndication agreement with the Guardian, and presents a number of German translations of that newspaper's content in every issue. Der Freitag publishes online daily, as well as weekly in print.

Circulation
Der Freitag has gained in circulation in the past few years. The current paid circulation amounts to 23.822 copies. Subscriptions account for 79% of paid circulation.
Since its relaunch in the first quarter of 2009, the number of subscriptions has grown by 132%.

Web presence
freitag.de is der Freitag's internet portal. The site was completely redesigned on 5 February 2014 and consists of articles from the print newspaper, online articles and contributions from the Freitag-Community (readers are thus given the opportunity to publish content and their opinion), as well as texts translated into German by the British syndication partner The Guardian. The editors work on both the print and online editions. Since November 2014, der Freitag digital offers the content of the current issue in the form of a web app for all mobile devices.

Further activities
Since October 2009 the newspaper has been hosting a regular series of political talks called "Freitag-Salon." Since 2015 the talks have been organised in cooperation with the Berlin radio station radioeins which broadcasts live the discussions between Freitag's editor-in-chief Jakob Augstein and his respective guest. Until February 2019 the radioeins und Freitag Salon took place in Berlins Maxim-Gorki-Theatre. Since March 2019 it has been moved to Volksbühne Berlin.

Awards
Together with Frankfurter Allgemeine Sonntagszeitung and The New York Times  der Freitag was chosen as World's Best Designed Newspaper 2009 by the Society for News Design in Orlando, Florida, in February 2010. In March of the same year its online content was chosen as web magazine of the year in the Lead Awards in Hamburg. In 2013 der Freitag received a silver medal in the category lead paper of the year. At the German Art Directors Club Awards held in Frankfurt am Main in May 2010, the online content received a bronze nail in the Online Editorial category. Ulrike Winkelmann, Head of the Political Affairs Department, was awarded the Alternative Media Prize 2011 for her satirical contribution to the Thilo Sarrazin debate entitled "Integrate yourselves!". In December 2011 Jakob Augstein was awarded the Bert-Donnepp-Preis - Deutscher Preis für Medienpublizistik 2011, with a "special honour". In November 2018, der Freitag won the award of European Newspaper of the Year 2018 in the category Weekly Newspaper at the 20th European Newspaper Award.

References

1946 establishments in Germany
Centre-left newspapers
German-language newspapers
Liberal media in Germany
Newspapers published in Berlin
Progressivism in Germany
Newspapers established in 1946
Weekly newspapers published in Germany